The Berlin Fire Brigade is the fire and rescue service for Berlin, Germany. As well as firefighting, the Berlin Fire Brigade provides fire prevention, technical rescue services, emergency medical services, and assistance in case of chemical, biological, radioactive and nuclear hazards (CBRN defense).

The brigade was officially formed on February 1, 1851, by Ludwig Scabell, under the command of King Frederick William IV. Since August 2018, the Berlin Fire Brigade is under the command of its Fire Chief (German: Landesbranddirektor, short LBD) Dr. Karsten Homrighausen.

The Berlin Fire Brigade is the oldest and largest municipal fire brigade in Germany. It has a total of 4,479 staff, including 4,082 operational firefighters and officers based at 35 main fire stations. It is supported by an additional 1,537 volunteer firefighters (German: Freiwillige Feuerwehr), based at 58 volunteer fire stations. The Berlin Fire Brigade has an annual budget of around €250,000,000, which includes personnel costs and investments.

In 2019, the Berlin Fire Brigade received 478,281 emergency calls. It is the busiest of all fire services in Germany. Approximately 83% of the alarms per year are for the emergency services, 5% for technical assistance and only 2% for firefighting.

History

Industrialization and Wilhelminian period (1851-1899)
Back in the mid-19th century, Berlin suffered a series of devastating fires. The city grew rapidly and buildings became more and more crowded. Resources could no longer keep up with the size of the buildings. Therefore, The King of Prussia decided in 1851 to command Ludwig Scabell to set up a professional fire brigade and ensure its training and equipment . Scabell created the Berlin Fire Brigade with the support of the former Berlin Police Chief Carl von Hickeldey. Within a very short period, almost 1,000 men were hired and trained while the professional fire stations were built. In the same year, the world's first electrical fire alarm network was installed in Berlin. The implementation was carried out by the German company Siemens & Halske. The innovation connected the headquarters at the Molkenmarkt with 24 fire stations and all police stations within the city. In 1854 the very first newly built fire station was opened, two years later a new water supply network with 1,520 hydrants went into operation in Berlin. Scabell retired in 1875 and was succeeded by Gustav Witte. In 1879 together, with the engineer and manufacturer Greiner, they received the German patent for the world's first turntable ladder. The Berlin Fire Brigade put their first turntable ladder, built by the German company BAMAG, into service at the main fire station in 1882.

Turn of the century, First World War and Weimar Republic (1900-1932)
In 1901 the International Fire Protection Exhibition took place in Berlin to mark the 50th anniversary of the professional fire brigade. In 1906 at the fire station in Berlin-Grunewald, the first gasoline fire truck in Germany equipped with a fire pump was put into service.  In 1908 Berlin purchased it's first electric fire engine.   During the First World War from 1914 to 1918, 700 officers had to go from the Berlin Fire Brigade to the Wehrmacht, where part of the firefighters were deployed in the newly created flamethrower regiments.

National Socialism (1933-1945)
On December 15, 1933, the term Feuerlöschpolizei (lit. 'Firefighting Police') was introduced for all Prussian fire brigades. The fire brigades throughout the German Reich were placed under the Ordnungspolizei, abbreviated Orpo (lit. 'Order Police'), in 1938 and called the Feuerschutzpolizei (lit.  'Fire Protection Police'). The previously red fire vehicles, blue uniforms and fire service ranks were replaced by green fire vehicles, green uniforms and police ranks. They were issued firearms and batons. With few exceptions, the Nazi-led fire protection police did not intervene in the November pogroms in 1938 when the synagogues in Berlin were set on fire.

One city - two fire brigades (1946-1990) 
After the Second World War, six of the 38 professional fire stations were lost. Of the 51 volunteer fire stations, three were totally destroyed while twelve were only partially. On November 21, 1948, the Berlin Fire Brigade was divided into two separate authorities in East and West Berlin. The first post-war fire stations were built on both sides during the 1950s. Technology and training in East and West developed separately. In 1952 the East Berlin Fire Brigade was incorporated into the Volkspolizei, abbreviated VoPo, (lit. 'German People's Police') as "Organ F" and issued firearms and batons. East Berlin also received a "west turntable ladder" to protect the massive buildings on Stalinallee, today known as Karl-Marx-Allee. The turntable ladder type DL 52 manufactured by Metz, with a rescue height of over 50 meters, had a car that could be used as an elevator. In the days after the Berlin Wall was built in 1961, the West Berlin Fire Brigade had to keep using its jumping blankets because people jumped from buildings on the demarcation line towards freedom in West Berlin. In 1969, the West Berlin Rescue Service was incorporated into the fire brigade. Since then, the West Berlin Fire Brigade has also been responsible for emergency services. In East Berlin, rescue services were carried out by the rescue office independently of the fire brigade until reunification. Since the early 1980s, the West Berlin fire brigade has repeatedly been involved in May riots in Berlin-Kreuzberg. A fire truck from the Berlin-Kreuzberg fire station was completely destroyed on the night of May 1, 1987.

Development since reunification 
On October 3, 1990, the day of German reunification, the East Berlin Fire Brigade was handed over to the West Berlin Fire Chief Wolfgang Scholz. At that time, the fire brigade had a total staff of 3,788 in West Berlin and 1,112 in East Berlin. In 1992 W. Scholz retired and Albrecht Broemme was appointed as the new Fire Chief of Berlin. In 1993/94, due to the high volume of urban traffic and the numerous new measures to calm the increase, new vehicle concepts were tested in the city districts: The firefighting vehicle LHF 16/12 City, short "City", was 2.2 m shorter, 20 cm narrower; and therefore, more agile than the conventional LHF 16 of the Berlin Fire Brigade. After the successful testing phase, 41 vehicles of this type were ordered from 1994 to 1997. On New Year's Eve 2000 there was a total failure of the IT control center, including the fallback level. For several hours it was not possible to place emergency calls. The vehicles were sent on patrols. There was only a marginal connection with the so-called Year 2000 problem. The affected operational control system FIS was replaced in 2000 by the more modern IGNIS and in 2017 by its successor IGNIS-Plus. In May 2006, Fire Chief Albrecht Broemme became president of the Technisches Hilfswerk. Initially, his deputy Wilfried Graefling became the temporary director and eventually the new Fire Chief of Berlin in November 2006. Graefling left the Berlin Fire Brigade at the end of July 2018 and retired. His successor since August 1, 2018 is Karsten Homrighausen. In 2018, colleagues from the Berliner Fire Brigade protested in front of the Rotes Rathaus, the home to the governing mayor and the government (the Senate of Berlin) of the Federal state of Berlin, under the catchphrase "BerlinBrennt" (lit. 'Berlin is Burning'). The causes included the increasing number of operations, inadequate equipment including vehicles and materials, as well as the lack of personnel- before the reunification of Berlin in 1990, only West Berlin had more staff than the reunited city from West and East in 2018.

Fire Chiefs

Special Operations 

 September 26, 1908 - Two elevated railway trains collide at metro station Gleisdreieck - 18 dead
 February 27, 1933 – Reichstag fire (German parliament)
 May 21, 1980 - Partial collapse of the congress hall
 1983 - Attack on the Maison de France
 April 5, 1986 - Attack on the La Belle discotheque - three dead (2 US soldiers, 1 Turkish civilian)
 16–21 December 1989 - Fire in a building with three hotel pensions on Kurfürstendamm / corner of Wielandstrasse extends to the largest hotel fire in German post-war history - eight dead
 1989/90 - Video wall collapsed at the New Year's Eve party at the Brandenburg Gate
 October 26, 1994 - Fire at the German Cathedral after welding work on the roof
 August 4, 1998 - Heavy gas explosion in Lepsiusstrasse
 July 8, 2000 - Fire in the underground station Deutsche Oper. 350 people had to be evacuated through a tunnel.
 July 10, 2002 - Hurricane "Anita" - worst storm in 30 years - 7 dead and 39 injured
 18 / 19 January 2007 - Hurricane "Kyrill" - a total of 1.001 alarms
 December 19, 2016 – Terrorist attack on Breitscheidplatz - truck drives into the Christmas market - 12 dead and 53 injured
 19/20 February 2019 - 36 hour power failure in the southeast of Berlin, evacuation of two hospitals, people from care facilities and from elevators. Maintenance of emergency care by mobile fire stations in cooperation with the police, the Red Cross and civil protection.
 10/11 May 2020 - Several warehouses in Berlin-Tegel burned, the Berlin Fire Brigade was on site with over 300 emergency personnel. The fire was under control after about 19 hours, after 21 hours the last forces were able to move away.

Legal basis and organization 

According to § 3 of the Feuerwehrgesetz Berlin, also FwG Berlin, (lit. 'Fire Brigade Act Berlin'), the Berlin Fire Brigade has been commissioned to: fight fire, prevent danger, preventive fire protection, disaster protection and emergency services. The Freiwllige Feuerwehr (Engl: volunteer fire department) of the Berlin Fire Brigade are members of the Berlin Fire Brigade Association (LFV). The LFV Berlin is a member of the German Fire Brigade Association (DFV) based in Berlin. The Berlin Fire Brigade is also responsible for the Werkfeuerwehren and Betriebsfeuerwehren in Berlin. These private fire brigades belong to companies and protect special infrastructures. One example of a Werkfeuerwehr in Berlin is the Bayer AG Werkfeuerwehr in Berlin-Wedding. They are in close professional contact with the Berlin Fire Brigade and, with the exception of the Berufsfeuerwehren, can be alerted for special operations.

Museum 

The fire brigade maintains its own museum located in Berlin-Tegel. It shows the history of the Berlin Fire Brigade in an exhibition.

Training and Education 

The training and further education is concentrated at the Berlin Fire and Rescue Service Academy, short BFRA. The main campus is located at Schulzendorfer Straße in the north-west of Berlin in the district of Berlin-Reinickendorf.  Another training location is situated in an office complex in Berlin-Tegel. In particular, medical training and the training of station officers and incident commanders are carried out there.

There are advanced plans to relocate the Berlin Fire and Rescue Service Academy to the area of the former Berlin TXL-Airport.

Structure 

Berlin has a total of 35 professional fire stations, 58 volunteer fire stations and 47 youth fire stations. The urban parts of Berlin with a high population density are covered by professional fire stations, which are staffed 24/7. The firefighters work in a 12-hour shift system structured in four subdivisions. Some professional fire stations have also accommodated volunteer fire brigades (type B) in the same building, who can provide support if necessary. In sparsely populated areas, the volunteer fire station (type A) maintain their own buildings and deployment areas in which they have primary responsibility for operations Vehicles, technical equipment and protective clothing of the volunteer fire stations correspond to those of the professional fire brigade.

Fire Stations

Volunteer Fire Stations

Equipment and Vehicles 

The Berlin Fire Brigade has a total of 920 vehicles. These include 194 fire engines (LHF / LF), 42 turntable ladders (DLK), 232 ambulances (RTW) and other medical service vehicles, 42 roll-off containers (AB), 82 trailers, a fire boat and five multi-purpose boats with water cannons. In addition to the different types of turntable ladders, the Berlin Fire Brigade also has a telescopic mast vehicle (TM 50). The TM 50 fire brigade telescopic mast from Metz Aerials / WUMAG on a MAN TGA chassis is used for rescuing people and fighting fires at heights. The working height is 50 meters (150 feet) . Special tank fire engines (TLF 24/40) were purchased to secure the 2.4 km long Tiergarten Spreebogen tunnel (TTS) and the city highway. All seats inside the cabin are equipped with self-contained breathing apparatus. The TLF 24/40 has a supply of 4,000 liters of water and 400 liters of foam concentrate. The vehicle is also used in forest fires. Since July 30, 2020, the Berlin Fire Brigade has been testing four emergency drones equipped with thermal imaging cameras to detect sources of fire and embers.

Berlin Concept "LHF": Fire Engine with comprehensive technical equipment 

The LHF (fire and rescue vehicle, German: Lösch- und Hilfeleistungsfahrzeug) is a special vehicle concept of the Berlin Fire Brigade. The vehicles can be used for firefighting as well as for various technical assistance (e.g. car accident, train accident, door opening, cutting, sealing). Their loading is very similar to that of "HLF", which are used very frequently in Germany. However, LHF in Berlin are shorter and therefore more agile in narrow streets.

LHF 16/16 
The first LHF was put into service with the fire brigade in early 1983. Compared to the extinguishing group vehicles and tank fire engines that were common at the time, the LHF is more extensively equipped with devices for technical assistance. It should be an all-round vehicle for firefighting and assistance. The LHF 16/16 has a fire pump with a capacity of 1,600 L / min at 8 bar, a water tank with 1,600 L and a permanently installed foam agent tank with 400 L foam concentrate. For technical assistance, the vehicle is equipped with a hydraulic rescue kit consisting of rescue scissors, spreader and a rescue ram with an additional hand pump.

LHF 16/12 City 
The LHF 16/12 City (short: City) has been used by the Berlin Fire Brigade since 1994. Compared to its predecessor, it has shrunk by 2.2 m in length and 20 cm in width, which means better maneuverability in road traffic. The LHF 16/12 also has a fire pump with an output of 1,600 L / min at 8 bar. The water container now only contains 1,200 L of water, the permanently installed foam agent container still contains 100 L of foam concentrate. For technical assistance, the vehicle, like its predecessor, is equipped with a portable generator and rescue kits. The LHF 16/12 is also available with all-wheel drive.

LHF 20/12 CAFS 
A new generation of LHF has been in use since the beginning of 2007, which is equipped with compressed air foam systems (CAFS, German: Druckluftschaum). The LHF 20/12 has a fire pump with an output of 2,000 L / min at 10 bar, 1,200 L of water, 100 L of foam concentrate and a DLS system (CAFS 1,000 or 1,200). The vehicle is equipped with a hydraulic rescue kit for technical assistance and also with an automatic transmission and a reversing camera. The fleet of the Berlin Fire Brigade has been renewed since 2018. In August 2019, the fire brigade got twelve new LHF 20/12 AT (lit. 'Advanced Technology'). By 2021, seventy more LHF 20/12 AT models are to be delivered.

LHF 20/8 
The LHF 20/8 was only procured for the volunteer fire departments and not for the professional fire brigade. The LHF 20/8 is based on a Mercedes-Benz Atego with all-wheel drive and has an 800-liter water tank (a 1,000 liter water tank is installed). The pumps deliver 2,000 liters / min at 10 bar. The vehicle body was developed by Rosenbauer.

LHF 10/5 
In 2011, two LHF 10/5 could be procured to replace the old LHF-K. The vehicles are the smallest LHF in Berlin. Like the LHF 20/8, they were only procured for the volunteer fire departments because the space circumstances did not allow for a larger LHF (bridges, fire stations that were too small). However, almost the same equipment is in the vehicles as in the larger fire engines. A Mercedes-Benz Vario 818D with a Rosenbauer body (Compactline) was selected as the chassis. The two LHF 10/5 are stationed in Rauchfangswerder and Wilhelmshagen. Their water capacity reaches 500 liters.

eLHF 
In September 2020, the first fully electrical fire truck (eLHF) was put into service for testing by the Berlin fire brigade. It results from a project of the Program for Sustainable Development (BENE 1213-B4-N), which is co-financed by the European Fund for Regional Development. The trial run will last until 2022.

Ambulance 
The Berlin Fire Brigade is responsible for the city's emergency services. The vast majority of annual operations are rescue operations. At the Berlin Fire Brigade, mainly Mercedes-Benz Sprinter vehicles with box bodies are used as ambulances. This design, in which the case can be detached from the chassis, enables a separate exchange of body or chassis after an accident or in the event of a technical defect. There is also an "Ambulance I" (intensive) for patients with highly contagious diseases, the Ambulance S (S = German shortcut: schwer; translation English: heavy) for the transport of overweight emergency patients and the Stroke Emergency Vehicle (STEMO) for stroke patients. As soon as 90% of the ambulances in Berlin are in use at the same time, the fire brigade control center calls out a kind of "state of emergency" and dispatches firefighters from fire engines to ambulances. In 2018, this happened 41 times, which resulted in delayed arrival times.

City partnership
In addition to the transatlantic sister city agreement between Los Angeles and Berlin there are also strong relations on the fire department level. The Los Angeles Fire Department (LAFD) and the Berliner Feuerwehr maintain a close partnership with constant visits.

See also
 German fire services

References

1851 establishments in Germany
Government agencies established in 1851
Fire departments of Germany
Non-profit organisations based in Berlin